The 2021 Copa del Rey de Baloncesto was the 85th edition of the Spanish Basketball King's Cup. It was managed by the ACB and was held in Madrid, in the WiZink Center in February 2021. All matches were played behind closed doors due to the COVID-19 pandemic.

Real Madrid was the defending champion which was defeated in the final by eternal rival Barça which conquered its 26th cup.

All times were in Central European Time (UTC+01:00).

Qualified teams 
The top eight ranking teams participated after the first half of the 2020–21 ACB regular season once Real Madrid has already mathematically guaranteed its host team status and its presence in the top eight.

Given the uncertainty generated by the COVID-19 pandemic, the ACB agreed that to use the win percentage over the total number of games played by each team as the first criterion to decide the qualification for the Copa del Rey, thus avoiding harming any club if it cannot play all their matches before the January 10 deadline.

The tiebreaker criteria in the qualification for the Copa del Rey is the following:
 Best win percentage over the total number of games played by each team.
 If the tie is not resolved, the greater total difference between points for and against taking into account all the games played in the regular season.
 If the tie is not resolved, the sum of the quotients of points in favor and against in each of the disputed matches were applied to the teams that remain tied, with the highest having it being the qualified team.

Venue 
On December 15, 2020, ACB selected and announced Madrid to host the Copa del Rey on February 2021. The former building, which was built in 1960, was destroyed by a fire in 2001. Architects Enrique Hermoso and Paloma Huidobro projected a High-Tech style new arena that was built at the same location between 2002 and 2005. The arena hosted two major international basketball events in the first decade of the 21st century - the knockout stage of EuroBasket 2007 and the 2008 Euroleague Final Four. It also hosted the Copa del Rey in 2006, 2009, 2011 and 2019. The arena was the finals venue for the 2014 FIBA Basketball World Cup and the 2015 Euroleague Final Four.

Draw 
The draw was held on 18 January 2021 in Madrid, Spain. The top four ranking teams act as seeded teams in the draw of the quarterfinals. For its part, the top ranking team will play its quarterfinal match on Thursday.

Bracket

Quarterfinals

Lenovo Tenerife vs. Hereda San Pablo Burgos

Real Madrid vs. Valencia Basket

TD Systems Baskonia vs. Joventut

Barça vs. Unicaja

Semifinals

Real Madrid vs. Lenovo Tenerife

Barça vs. TD Systems Baskonia

Final

References

External links 
 Official website 

Copa del Rey de Baloncesto
2020–21 in Spanish basketball
February 2021 sports events in Spain
2021 in Spanish sport